The 2023 Laurie O'Reilly Cup will be the 14th edition of the rugby union competition. Australia will host the Black Ferns in the first of two O’Reilly Cup matches, which also doubles as a Pacific Four Series test. The second O’Reilly Cup match is set to take place in New Zealand in September.

Table

Fixtures

Test 1

Test 2

References 

Laurie O'Reilly Cup
Australia women's national rugby union team
New Zealand women's national rugby union team
Laurie O'Reilly Cup
Laurie O'Reilly Cup
Laurie O'Reilly Cup
Laurie O'Reilly Cup
Laurie O'Reilly Cup
Laurie O'Reilly Cup